Dejan Karaklajić (born 1 May 1946 in Belgrade) is a Serbian television and film director. Karaklajić was active from the late 1960s through to the early 1980s and mainly worked on television films made by Radiotelevizija Beograd (today called Radio Television of Serbia). He also directed two feature films, Beloved Love (Ljubavni život Budimira Trajkovića, 1977; starring Milena Dravić and Ljubiša Samardžić) and Erogenous Zone (Erogena zona, 1981).

External links

1946 births
Living people
Television people from Belgrade
Serbian film directors
Serbian television directors